Frederick Charles Hopkins was an English Jesuit and Catholic bishop in British Honduras, Central America, at the turn of the 20th century.

Missionary bishop
Frederick C. Hopkins was born 12 December 1844 in Birmingham, England. He entered the Society of Jesus in September 1868 and was ordained a priest on 23 September 1877. He arrived on the British Honduras mission in January 1888. He became Superior of the mission in 1892 and Vicar General in 1893. On the demise of Bishop Salvatore di Pietro, Hopkins was made Vicar Apostolic of British Honduras on 17 August 1899. He was consecrated bishop in St. Francis Xavier College Church in St. Louis on 5 November 1899. His cathedral parish was Holy Redeemer in Belize City. In 1910, when the Mercy motherhouse in New Orleans was no longer able to send sisters to Belize, Hopkins obtained permission from Rome and they opened an independent motherhouse in Belize. Then in 1913 Hopkins welcomed the Sisters of the Catholic Apostolate (Pallottines) to Belize, to labor first in Corozal Town and Benque Viejo.

Writer 
 
Before becoming bishop, Hopkins was editor of The Angelus, the Roman Catholic newspaper for British Honduras (later "Belize"), and chronicled the early history of the mission. Much of what he wrote was from his own experience, as of the need to "get out of the pitpan and pull it up the raging waters." While bishop he wrote The Catholic Church in British Honduras (1851-1918). On 9 April 1923, Hopkins died when a coastal boat that he was travelling in sank, taking his life and that of two sisters headed with him to the Corozal mission.

References

1844 births
1923 deaths
People from Birmingham, West Midlands
19th-century English Jesuits
20th-century English Jesuits
Jesuit bishops
English Roman Catholic missionaries
Roman Catholic missionaries in Belize
20th-century Roman Catholic bishops in Belize
Jesuits in Belize
Jesuit missionaries
Roman Catholic writers
British expatriate bishops
Roman Catholic bishops of Belize City–Belmopan